Ezio Mantelli (10 February 1924 – 27 June 2002) was an Italian basketball player. He competed in the men's tournament at the 1948 Summer Olympics.

References

External links
 

1924 births
2002 deaths
Italian men's basketball players
Olympic basketball players of Italy
Basketball players at the 1948 Summer Olympics